The Movement of Spiritual Inner Awareness (or MSIA) is a 501(c)(3) non-profit religious corporation, incorporated in California on June 25, 1971. Before incorporation, the group was founded in California in 1968 by John-Roger (formerly Roger Delano Hinkins). The church has about 5,000 active students in 32 countries, mainly the United States.

History and teachings

MSIA teaches an active meditation technique known as Spiritual Exercises (SEs).  Chanting specific sacred Sanskrit words internally is part of SEs.  In this aspect MSIA SEs are similar to Transcendental Meditation (TM) practices. MSIA also offers its students a twelve-year study support subscription called Soul Awareness Discourses. Discourses are seen as an opportunity for individuals to connect inwardly with their own Divinity, each according to their desire and intention.  Topics covered expose students to the teachings of MSIA and educate them to stay focused on their individual spiritual practices and service to others. Both initiatory tones and personal discourses are deemed sacred to each student individually and are not shared.

The Founder, John-Roger (formerly Roger Hinkins) died on October 22, 2014. His successor, John Morton directs the group. Both have been referred to as the "Traveler".

MSIA considers itself a church in very few traditional senses of the word.  A deeply ambivalent attitude towards traditional "religiosity" characterizes the "Movement."  While it is legally incorporated as a church and provides tools and techniques for Soul transcendence for those who are looking for them, it prohibits members from evangelizing; it spreads primarily by word of mouth.  MSIA has no program of building churches or other buildings, giving it similarities with other 'churches without walls.'  It ordains ministers, but ordains no one to preach or teach, only to be of service.  Service choices are determined entirely individually.  MSIA has only vague and wide guidelines here.

Soul Transcendence, as defined by MSIA, is the process of becoming aware of yourself as a soul and as one with God. MSIA considers that its teachings draw primarily on the ministry of Jesus Christ ("The Christ Consciousness is the spiritual line of energy undergirding MSIA"); teachings also include elements of Buddhism, Taoism, Judaism, and the Sant Mat/Radhasoami tradition.

Founder

Roger Delano Hinkins was born on September 24, 1934, to a Mormon family in Rains, Utah. Hinkins was raised in Utah and received a Bachelor of Science degree in psychology from the University of Utah in 1958 before moving to San Francisco to work as an insurance claims adjuster before getting a job teaching English at Rosemead High School in a suburb of Los Angeles.

According to Hinkins' official web site, he first attended the University of Utah, receiving a Bachelor of Science degree in psychology in 1958 and a Secondary Teaching Credential in 1960; he later performed post-graduate work at the University of California, Los Angeles, the University of Southern California and California State University, Los Angeles. Hinkins also held a California Secondary Life Teaching Credential, and a Doctorate of Spiritual Science from the Peace Theological Seminary & College of Philosophy, an unaccredited institution which Hinkins founded in 1977.

In the early 1960s, Hinkins took a correspondence course with the Ancient Mystical Order Rosae Crucis and occasionally attended the Agasha Temple of Wisdom. Eckankar asserts that Hinkins also joined their group in 1967 and was given a second initiation by its founder Paul Twitchell in 1968 but this is disputed.

In late 1963, Hinkins underwent a kidney stone surgery, which led to a nine-day coma and near-death experience. Shortly after this, Hinkins visited two trance-channelers and claimed to have encountered a higher consciousness named 'John within himself', and began referring to himself as John-Roger.

In 1971 Hinkins formally organized MSIA as a tax-exempt church based in California, United States.

John-Roger died at age 80 on October 22, 2014 of pneumonia after several years of poor health.

Related organizations founded by John-Roger 

 Peace Theological Seminary & College of Philosophy (PTS)
 University of Santa Monica (USM)
 Institute for Individual and World Peace (IIWP)
 Insight Seminars
 Heartfelt Foundation
 Mandeville Press

Criticism and controversy 
MSIA has been criticized by a variety of people over the years, but David C. Lane and Peter McWilliams, who provide the most substantive body of criticism, both focus on the role of founder John-Roger. The gist of Lane's criticism of Hinkins is that he used spiritual teachings taken from Paul Twitchell's Eckankar (who in turn took them from Radha Soami Satsang Beas, with which Lane is actively involved). 

Ex-MSIA Minister Peter McWilliams wrote Life 102: What to Do When Your Guru Sues You, which was critical of Hinkins. McWilliams also dismisses MSIA as little more than a personality cult. In his book McWilliams asserts that Hinkins suffered from narcissistic personality disorder, possibly due to his 1963 coma.

McWilliams chronicles his extended relationship with Hinkins, accusing him of various misrepresentations and improprieties. However, McWilliams later agreed to abandon the copyright to MSIA to settle libel litigation over the contents of the book, and later asked that the book be removed from circulation in a notarized letter, stating "the content of the book is no longer one with which I would like to have my name associated."

In his book The Missionary Position author Christopher Hitchens criticizes both Mother Teresa and John-Roger for a staged photo shoot where the two posed together in a studio with a blank backdrop. A blurred backdrop of Calcutta's poor was added later. Hitchens questions the ethics of such a shoot, as well as Mother Teresa for accepting US$10,000 as part of an "Integrity Award" from MSIA, which he describes as having been "exposed in print as corrupt and fanatical".

Cult allegations 

MSIA has frequently been accused of being a cult of personality. Whether or not MSIA should be labeled a cult is a matter of dispute. Both the movement and its founder have been through alleged scandals (published in People Magazine and the Los Angeles Times among other publications) suggesting financial improprieties as well as sexual misconduct by Hinkins. MSIA gained widespread attention during the senatorial campaign of Michael Huffington, whose wife, Arianna Huffington, denied that she was a member of MSIA.

Notable persons who have studied in MSIA 
Several well-known individuals and public figures have been involved with MSIA. The most prominent of these is Arianna Huffington. Other notable members are the Beach Boys' Carl Wilson, model/actress Jaime King-Newman, actress Sally Kirkland, an MSIA minister since 1975, actress Leigh Taylor-Young, also an MSIA minister since 1975, actor Jsu Garcia, and author and management consultant David Allen. Author Peter McWilliams was also an MSIA minister but later repudiated MSIA and made a series of personal allegations against MSIA leader John-Roger in his book Life 102: What to Do When Your Guru Sues You.

References 

 Frank Rich. "Journal; Manchurian Candidate II", The New York Times, 1994-10-13.

External links 

 MSIA's Official Website
 University of Virginia Religious Movements Homepage Project Entry on MSIA retrieved 2 November 2007
 MSIA Facts – hosted by MSIA in rebuttal to allegations of being a sect or cult retrieved 21 August 2008
 John-Roger's Official Website
 1988 Article from People

 
Cults
New religious movements
Self religions
501(c)(3) organizations
Non-profit organizations based in California
Religious corporations